Patrycja Adamkiewicz (born 11 June 1998) is a Polish taekwondo athlete.

Career 
In 2019 she won a bronze medal at the 2019 Summer Universiade at the women's featherweight event.

She qualified to the 2020 Summer Olympics through the 2021 European Taekwondo Olympic Qualification Tournament.

She competed in the women's featherweight event at the 2022 World Taekwondo Championships held in Guadalajara, Mexico.

References

External links
 

1998 births
Living people
Polish female taekwondo practitioners
European Taekwondo Championships medalists
Medalists at the 2019 Summer Universiade
Universiade medalists in taekwondo
Universiade bronze medalists for Poland
Taekwondo practitioners at the 2014 Summer Youth Olympics
Taekwondo practitioners at the 2020 Summer Olympics
Olympic taekwondo practitioners of Poland
21st-century Polish women